The Antalo Limestone, also known as the Antalo Sequence, is a geological formation in Ethiopia. It is between 300 and 800 metres thick and comprises fossiliferous limestones and marls that were deposited in a reef. Marine microfossils have shown an age between 165 and 150 million years.

Name and definition 
The Antalo Supersequence includes two main stratigraphic units: the Antalo Sequence and the Agula Group. The Antalo Sequence, or Antalo Limestone has been named after the town of Hintalo in Tigray, Ethiopia. The name of the formation  was coined by geologist William Thomas Blanford, who accompanied the British Expedition to Abyssinia in 1868. At that time, Hintalo was a major town on the route of the invading British army. So far the nomenclature has not been proposed for recognition to the International Commission on Stratigraphy.

Geographical extent 
The sedimentary succession is found in Ethiopia, in the Mekelle Outlier, in the Blue Nile gorge, in the Harrar Plateau and around Dire Dawa.

Stratigraphic context 
The Antalo Limestone overlies the Adigrat Sandstone, and is covered by the Agula Group or Agula Shale and the Mugher Mudstone.

Environment 
The Antalo Limestone comprises sediment that was deposited in a shallow tropical sea in the upper Jurassic. As the region had undergone a marine transgression, it was below the sea level. At that time, what would become Ethiopia was positioned just south of the equator.

Lithology 

The limestones and marls of the Antalo Sequence also hold shale and calcareous sandstone layers. The Antalo Limestone comprises four members: (1) a basal member with grainstone and wackestone lithologies, with marly interlayers and in the upper part stromatoporoid coral-like level; (2) sandy limestone deposited in estuaries and lagoons; (3) micritic (very fine grained) limestone with intercalations of wackestone and coquina beds deposited in relatively deep water; and (4) a succession of marls and limestone, with cherty limestone at the base.

Fossil content 

The Antalo Limestone sediments were deposited at the time of dinosaurs and primitive birds. Well away from coasts, coral reefs formed the edge of the continental shelf. At shallow depth, the sea bottom was made of large mudflats, with sand bars and spits near river mouths. This sea bed hosted many invertebrate animals: echinoderms, crustaceans, bivalves and gastropods  were common. There was also fish. As it was not a nutrient-rich ecosystem, larger predators were rare, maybe some marine reptiles like crocodiles. A striking scavenger in this fauna was a cephalopod mollusc, a giant nautilus with a characteristic spiral shell.

Invertebrates

Limestone and karst geomorphology 

The layering is sub-horizontal, the same as that of the underlying sedimentary formations. This gives rise to a structural sub-horizontal relief, with alternating cliffs and flats. Dissolution processes in limestone lead to the occurrence of caves. Most described caves in Mesozoic limestone in Ethiopia are located in the Harrar region (Sof Omar cave) and in the Dogu’a Tembien district of Tigray.

Traditional uses of Antalo Limestone 

Given its nearly rectangular shape and its strength, the hard layers of Antalo Limestone are used for
 House building. Traditionally, fermented mud will be used as mortar
 Fencing of homesteads, generally in dry masonry
 Milling stone: for this purpose plucked-bedrock pits, small rock-cut basins that naturally occur in rivers with kolks, are excavated from the river bed and further shaped. Milling is done at home using an elongated small boulder (mano)
 Door and window lintels
 Footpath paving
 Stone bunds or gedeba: terrace walls in dry masonry, typically laid out along the contour for sake of soil and water conservation
 Check dams in gullies for sake of gully erosion control
 Cobble stones, sold to the towns for paving secondary streets

See also
Ausichicrinites

References 

Geologic formations of Eritrea
Geologic formations of Ethiopia
Jurassic System of Africa
Oxfordian Stage
Kimmeridgian Stage
Limestone formations
Marl formations
Shallow marine deposits
Paleontology in Eritrea
Paleontology in Ethiopia
Formations